is a Japanese tennis player.

On 10 November 2014, she reached a career-high singles ranking of world No. 144. On 27 May 2019, she peaked at No. 28 in the WTA doubles rankings.

Partnering with Miyu Kato, she reached semifinals of the 2017 Australian Open. She also played the first Grand Slam singles tournament there, losing in the first round to Carina Witthöft.

Hozumi won her first WTA Tour doubles title in 2016, at the Katowice Open alongside Miyu Kato.

Performance timelines

Only main-draw results in WTA Tour, Grand Slam tournaments, Fed Cup/Billie Jean King Cup and Olympic Games are included in win–loss records and career statistics.

Doubles

Grand Slam tournament finals

Doubles: 1 (runner-up)

WTA career finals

Doubles: 10 (5 titles, 5 runner-ups)

WTA Challenger finals

Doubles: 6 (3 titles, 3 runner–ups)

ITF Circuit finals

Singles: 12 (5 titles, 7 runner–ups)

Doubles: 41 (21 titles, 20 runner–ups)

Notes

References

External links
 
 

1994 births
Living people
Japanese female tennis players
Sportspeople from Kanagawa Prefecture
People from Hiratsuka, Kanagawa
Tennis players at the 2014 Asian Games
Asian Games medalists in tennis
Asian Games bronze medalists for Japan
Tennis players at the 2016 Summer Olympics
Olympic tennis players of Japan
Medalists at the 2014 Asian Games
Tennis players at the 2018 Asian Games
20th-century Japanese women
21st-century Japanese women